Format of entries is:
 ICAO (IATA) – Airport Name – Airport Location

WA WI WQ WR - Indonesia 

Note: ICAO codes for Indonesia start with WA, WI, WQ and WR.

WA 
 WA44 (TQQ) – Maranggo Airport – Tomia Island, Southeast Sulawesi
 WAAA (UPG) – Sultan Hasanuddin International Airport – Makassar, South Sulawesi
 WAAB (BUW) – Betoambari Airport – Baubau
 WAAJ (MJU) – Tampa Padang Airport – Mamuju, West Sulawesi
 WAAM (MXB) – Andi Jemma Airport – Masamba
 WAAS (SQR) – Soroako Airport – Soroako
 WAAU (KDI) – Wolter Monginsidi Airport – Kendari, Southeast Sulawesi
 WABB (BIK) – Frans Kaisiepo Airport – Biak, Papua
 WABD (ONI) – Moanamani Airport – Moanamani
 WABF (FOO) – Jembruwo Airport – Noemfoor
 WABG (WET) – Waghete Airport – Waghete
 WABI (NBX) – Nabire Airport – Nabire
 WABL (ILA) – Ilaga Airport – Ilaga
 WABT (EWI) – Enarotali Airport – Enarotali
 WADA (AMI) – Selaparang Airport – Mataram, West Nusa Tenggara
 WADB (BMU) – Bima Airport (aka Sultan Muhammad Salahuddin Airport) – Bima
 WADD (DPS) – Ngurah Rai International Airport – Denpasar, Bali
 WADL (LOP) – Lombok International Airport – Praya, Lombok
 WADT (TMC) – Tambolaka Airport – Tambolaka, East Nusa Tenggara
 WADW (WGP) – Umbu Mehang Kunda Airport – Waingapu, East Nusa Tenggara
 WAEE (TTE) – Babullah Airport – Ternate, North Maluku
 WAFF (PLW) – Mutiara Airport – Palu, Central Sulawesi
 WAGG (PKY) – Tjilik Riwut Airport – Palangka Raya, Central Kalimantan
 WAHH (JOG) – Adisucipto International Airport – Yogyakarta, Special Region of Yogyakarta
 WAHI (YIA) – Yogyakarta International Airport – Kulon Progo Regency, Special Region of Yogyakarta
 WAHQ (SOC) – Adisumarmo International Airport (Adi Sumarmo Wiryokusumo) – Surakarta (Solo), Central Java
 WAHS (SRG) – Achmad Yani International Airport – Semarang, Central Java
 WAJA (ARJ) – Arso Airport – Arso
 WAJB (BUI) – Bokondini Airport – Bokondini
 WAJJ (DJJ) – Sentani Airport – Jayapura, Papua
 WAJK – Kiwirok Airport – Papua
 WAJL (LHI) – Lereh Airport – Lereh
 WAJM (LII) – Mulia Airport – Mulia
 WAJO (OKL) – Oksibil Airport – Oksibil
 WAJR (WAR) – Waris Airport – Waris
 WAJS (SEH) – Senggeh Airport – Senggeh
 WAKD (MDP) – Mindiptana Airport – Mindiptana
 WAKE (BXD) – Bade Airport – Bade
 WAKK (MKQ) – Mopah Airport – Merauke
 WAKO (OKQ) – Okaba Airport – Okaba
 WAKP (KEI) – Kepi Airport – Kepi
 WAKT (TMH) – Tanah Merah Airport – Tanahmerah
 WALE (GHS) – West Kutai Melalan Airport – Melak, East Kalimantan
 WALF (NNX) – Nunukan Airport – Nunukan, East Kalimantan
 WALL (BPN) – Sultan Aji Muhammad Sulaiman Airport – Balikpapan, East Kalimantan
 WALM (LNU) – Robert Atty Bessing Airport – Malinau City, North Kalimantan
 WALP (LPU) – Long Apung Airport – Long Apung, East Kalimantan
 WALS (AAP) – Aji Pangeran Tumenggung Pranoto Airport – Samarinda
 WALV (BYQ) – Bunyu Airport – Bunyu, East Kalimantan
 WAMA (GLX) – Gamarmalamo Airport – Galela
 WAMH (NAH) – Naha Airport (Indonesia) – Sangihe Islands
 WAMI (TLI) – Lalos Airport – Toli Toli
 WAMK (KAZ) – Kuabang Airport – Kao, North Maluku
 WAMM (MDC) – Sam Ratulangi International Airport – Manado, North Sulawesi
 WAMN (MNA) – Melangguane Airport – Melangguane
 WAMP (PSJ) – Kasiguncu Airport – Poso, Central Sulawesi
 WAMR (OTI) – Leo Wattimena Airport – Morotai, North Maluku
 WAMW (LUW) – Syukuran Aminuddin Amir Airport – Luwuk, Central Sulawesi
 WAGI (PKN) – Iskandar Airport – Pangkalan Bun
 WAOK (KBU) – Gusti Syamsir Alam Airport – Kotabaru Hilir, South Kalimantan
 WAON (TJG) – Warukin Airport – Tabalong, South Kalimantan
 WAOO (BDJ) – Syamsudin Noor Airport – Banjarmasin, South Kalimantan
 WAOS (SMQ) – Sampit Airport – Sampit
 WAPA (AHI) – Amahai Airport – Amahai, West Papua
 WAPD (DOB) – Dobo Airport – Dobo
 WAPE (MAL) – Mangole Airport – Mangole Island
 WAPF (LUV) – Karel Sadsuitubun Airport – Maluku
 WAPG (NRE) – Namrole Airport – South Buru, Maluku
 WAPI (SXK) – Saumlaki Airport – Saumlaki
 WAPL (LUV) – Dumatubin Airport – Langgur
 WAPN (SQN) – Sanana Airport – Sanana
 WAPP (AMQ) – Pattimura Airport – Ambon, Maluku
 WAPR (NAM) – Namniwel Airport – Namlea, Buru, Maluku
 WAPT (TAX) – Taliabu Airport – Taliabu Island
 WAQQ (TRK) – Juwata International Airport – Tarakan, North Kalimantan
 WARA (MLG) - Abdul Rachman Saleh Airport - Malang, East Java
 WARB (BWX) - Blimbingsari Airport - Banyuwangi, East Java
 WARI – Iswahyudi Airfield – Madiun
 WARR (SUB) – Juanda International Airport – Sidoarjo (near Surabaya)
 WASC (RSK) – Abresso Airport – Ransiki
 WASE (KEQ) – Kebar Airport – Kebar
 WASF (FKQ) – Fakfak Torea Airport – Fak Fak
 WASI (INX) – Inanwatan Airport – Inanwatan
 WASK (KNG) – Kaimana Airport – Kaimana
 WASM (RDE) – Merdei Airport – Merdei
 WASO (BXB) – Babo Airport – Babo
 WASS (SOQ) – Sorong Airport – Sorong
 WAST (TXM) – Teminabuan Airport – Teminabuan
 WASW (WSR) – Wasior Airport – Wasior
 WATA (ABU) – Haliwen Airport – Atambua, East Nusa Tenggara
 WATB (BJW) – Soa Airport – Bajawa, East Nusa Tenggara
 WATC (MOF) – Frans Seda Airport – Maumere, East Nusa Tenggara
 WATE (ENE) – H. Hasan Aroeboesman Airport – Ende, East Nusa Tenggara
 WATG (RTG) – Frans Sales Lega Airport – Ruteng, East Nusa Tenggara
 WATL (LKA) – Gewayantana Airport – Larantuka, East Nusa Tenggara
 WATM (ARD) – Mali Airport – Alor, East Nusa Tenggara
 WATO (LBJ) – Komodo Airport – Labuan Bajo, East Nusa Tenggara
 WATR (RTI) – D.C. Saudale Airport – Pulau Rote, East Nusa Tenggara
 WATS (SAU) – Tardamu Airport – Sabu, East Nusa Tenggara
 WATT (KOE) – El Tari Airport – Kupang, East Nusa Tenggara
 WATW (LWE) – Wunopito Airport – Lewoleba, East Nusa Tenggara
 WAUU (MKW) – Rendani Airport – Manokwari
 WAVV (WMX) – Wamena Airport – Wamena
 WAYY (TIM) – Timika Airport – Tembagapura

WI 
 WIAA (SBG) - Maimun Saleh Airport - Sabang, Aceh
 WIBB (PKU) - Sultan Syarif Qasim II International Airport (Simpang Tiga Airport) - Pekanbaru, Riau
 WIBD (DUM) - Pinang Kampai Airport - Dumai, Riau
 WIBR (RKI) - Rokot Airport - Sipura
 WIBT (TJB) - Sunjai Bati Airport - Tanjung Balai
 WICA (KJT) - Kertajati International Airport - Majalengka, West Java
 WICB (BTO) - Budiarto Airport - Tangerang, Banten
 WICC (BDO) - Husein Sastranegara International Airport - Bandung, West Java
 WICD (CBN) - Cakrabhuwana Airport (formerly Penggung Airport) - Cirebon, West Java
 WICM (TSY) - Tasikmalaya Airport - Tasikmalaya, West Java
 WICN (CJN) - Nusawiru Airport - Pangandaran, West Java
 WIDD (BTH) - Hang Nadim Airport - Batam, Riau Islands
 WIDN (TNJ) - Raja Haji Fisabilillah Airport (formerly Kijang Airport) - Tanjung Pinang, Riau Islands
 WIDS (SIQ) - Dabo Airport - Singkep, Riau
 WIEE (PDG) - Minangkabau International Airport (replaced Tabing Airport) - Ketaping, Padang Pariaman, West Sumatra
 WIGG (BKS) - Fatmawati Soekarno Airport - Bengkulu
 WIHH (HLP) - Halim Perdanakusuma International Airport - Jakarta
 WIHL (CXP) - Tunggul Wulung Airport - Cilacap, Central Java
 WIII (CGK) - Soekarno-Hatta International Airport - Tangerang, Banten (near Jakarta)
 WIIP (PCB) - Pondok Cabe Airport - South Tangerang
 WIIS (SRG) - Ahmad Yani Airport - Semarang, Jawa Tengah
 WIIT (TKG) - Radin Inten II Airport (Branti Airport) - Bandar Lampung, Lampung
 WIIX (JKT) - Jakarta (City) Airport - Jakarta
 WIJJ (DJB) - Sultan Thaha Airport - Jambi
 WIKK (PGK) - Depati Amir Airport - Pangkal Pinang, Bangka Belitung Islands
 WIKL (LLG) - Silampari Airport - Lubuklinggau, South Sumatra
 WIKT (TJQ) - H.A.S. Hanandjoeddin Airport (formerly Buluh Tumbang Airport) - Tanjung Pandan
 WIMB (GNS) - Binaka Airport - Gunungsitoli, North Sumatra
 WIME (AEG) - Aek Godang Airport - Padang Sidempuan
 WIMG (PDG) - Tabing Airport (replaced by Minangkabau International Airport) - Padang, West Sumatra
 WIML (SNX) - Lasikin Airport (Sinabang) - Simeulue, Aceh
 WIMK (MES) - Polonia International Airport (replaced by Kualanamu International Airport) - Medan, North Sumatra
 WIMM (KNO) - Kualanamu International Airport - Deli Serdang, North Sumatra
 WIOG (NPO) - Nanga Pinoh Airport - Kalimantan
 WIOK (KTG) - Rahadi Osman Airport - Ketapang
 WIOM (MWK) - Matak Airport - Anambas Islands, Riau Province
 WION (NTX) - Ranai Airport - Ranai, Riau Islands
 WIOO (PNK) - Supadio Airport - Pontianak, West Kalimantan
 WIOP (PSU) - Pangsuma Airport - Putussibau
 WIOS (SQG) - Tebelian Airport - Sintang
 WIPI (BUU) - Muara Bungo Airport - Jambi
 WIPP (PLM) - Sultan Mahmud Badaruddin II Airport - Palembang, South Sumatra
 WIPQ (PDO) - Pendopo Airport - Pendopo
 WIPR (RGT) - Japura Airport - Rengat, Riau
 WIPU (MPC) - Mukomuko Airport - Mukomuko, Bengkulu
 WIPV (KLQ) - Keluang Airport - Keluang
 WITA (TPK) - Teuku Cut Ali Airport - Tapak Tuan
 WITC (MEQ) - Cut Nyak Dien Airport - Meulaboh, Aceh
 WITG (SMG) - Lasikin Airport - Sinabang, Aceh
 WITL (LSX) - Lhok Sukon Airport - Lhok Sukon (Lhoksukon), Aceh
 WITT (BTJ) - Sultan Iskandarmuda Airport (Blang Bintang Airport) - Banda Aceh, Aceh

WQ 
 WQKN – Primapun Airport – Primapun

WR 
 WRBC (BTW) – Batulicin Airport – Batulicin, South Kalimantan
 WRKB (BJW) – Bajawa Soa Airport – Bajawa, East Nusa Tenggara
 WRLB (LBW) – Long Bawan Airport – Long Bawan
 WRLC (BXT) – Bontang Airport – Bontang
 WRLF (NNX) – Nunukan Airport – Nunukan, East Kalimantan
 WRLH (TNB) – Tanah Grogot Airport – Tanah Grogot
 WRLS (SRI) – Temindung Airport – Samarinda, East Kalimantan
 WRLT (TSX) – Santan Airport – Tanjung Santan
 WRRS (SWQ) – Sumbawa Besar Airport – Sumbawa, West Nusa Tenggara
 WRSC (CPF) – Ngloram Airport – Cepu
 WRST (SUP) – Trunojoyo Airport – Sumenep
 WRSS (SUB) – Djuanda Airport – Surabaya

WB - Brunei and East Malaysia

Brunei 

 WBAK – Anduki Airfield – Anduki / Seria
 WBSB (BWN) – Brunei International Airport – Bandar Seri Begawan

Malaysia 

 WBGA – Long Atip Airport – Long Atip
 WBGB (BTU) – Bintulu Airport – Bintulu, Sarawak
 WBGC (BLG) – Belaga Airport – Belaga, Sarawak
 WBGD (LSM) – Long Semado Airport – Long Semado / Lawas, Sarawak
 WBGE – Long Geng Airport – Long Geng
 WBGF (LGL) – Long Lellang Airport – Long Lellang, Sarawak
 WBGG (KCH) – Kuching International Airport – Kuching, Sarawak
 WBGI (ODN) – Long Seridan Airport – Long Seridan, Sarawak
 WBGJ (LMN) – Limbang Airport – Limbang, Sarawak
 WBGK (MKM) – Mukah Airport – Mukah, Sarawak
 WBGL (LKH) – Long Akah Airport – Long Akah
 WBGM (MUR) – Marudi Airport – Marudi, Sarawak
 WBGN (BSE) – Sematan Airport – Sematan
 WBGO – Lio Matu Airport – Lio Matu
 WBGP (KPI) – Kapit Airport – Kapit, Sarawak
 WBGQ (BKM) – Ba'kelalan Airport – Ba'kelalan, Sarawak
 WBGR (MYY) – Miri Airport – Miri, Sarawak
 WBGS (SBW) – Sibu Airport – Sibu, Sarawak
 WBGT – Tanjung Manis Airport – Tanjung Manis
 WBGU (LSU) – Long Sukang Airport – Long Sukang, Sarawak
 WBGW (LWY) – Lawas Airport – Lawas, Sarawak
 WBGY (SGG) – Simanggang Airport – Sri Aman, Sarawak
 WBGZ (BBN) – Bario Airport – Bario, Sarawak
 WBKA (SMM) – Semporna Airport – Semporna, Sabah
 WBKB – Kota Belud Airport – Kota Belud, Sabah
 WBKD (LDU) – Lahad Datu Airport – Lahad Datu, Sabah
 WBKE (TEL) – Telupid Airport – Telupid
 WBKG (KGU) – Keningau Airport – Keningau, Sabah
 WBKH (SXS) – Sahabat Airport – Sahabat, Sabah
 WBKK (BKI) – Kota Kinabalu International Airport – Kota Kinabalu, Sabah
 WBKL (LBU) – RMAF Labuan – Labuan, Sabah
 WBKM (TMG) – Tommanggong Airport – Tommanggong
 WBKN (GSA) – Long Pasia Airport – Long Pasia, Sabah
 WBKO (SPE) – Sepulot Airport – Sepulot
 WBKP (PAY) – Pamol Airport – Pamol
 WBKR (RNU) – Ranau Airport – Ranau, Sabah
 WBKS (SDK) – Sandakan Airport – Sandakan, Sabah
 WBKT (KUD) – Kudat Airport – Kudat, Sabah
 WBKU – Kuala Penyu Airport – Kuala Penyu, Sabah
 WBKW (TWU) – Tawau Airport – Tawau, Sabah
 WBMU (MZV) – Mulu Airport – Mulu, Sarawak

WM - Peninsular Malaysia 

 WMAA – Bahau Airport – Bahau, Negeri Sembilan
 WMAB – Batu Pahat Airport – Batu Pahat, Johor
 WMAC – Benta Airport – Benta, Pahang
 WMAD – Bentong Airport – Bentong, Pahang
 WMAE – Bidor Airport – Bidor, Perak
 WMAH – RMAF Grik – Grik
 WMAJ – Jendarata Airport – Jendarata
 WMAN – Sungai Tiang Airport – Sungai Tiang
 WMAO – Kong Kong Airport – Kong Kong, Johor
 WMAP – Kluang Airport – Kluang, Johor
 WMAQ – Labis Airport – Labis, Johor
 WMAU (MEP) – Mersing Airport – Mersing, Johor
 WMAV – Muar Airport – Muar, Johor
 WMAZ – Segamat Airport – Segamat, Johor
 WMBA (SWY) – Sitiawan Airport – Sitiawan, Perak
 WMBB – Sungei Patani Airport – Sungei Patani
 WMBE – Temerloh Airport – Temerloh, Pahang
 WMBF – Ulu Bernam Airport – Ulu Bernam
 WMBH – RMAF Kroh – Kroh
 WMBI (TPG) – Tekah Airport / Taiping Airport – Taiping, Perak
 WMBJ – Jugra Airport – Jugra, Selangor
 WMBT (TOD) – Tioman Airport – Tioman Island (Pulau Tioman), Pahang
 WMGK – RMAF Gong Kedak – Gong Kedak Terengganu
 WMKA (AOR) – Sultan Abdul Halim Airport – Alor Star, Kedah
 WMKB (BWH) – RMAF Butterworth – Butterworth, Penang
 WMKC (KBR) – Sultan Ismail Petra Airport – Kota Bharu, Kelantan
 WMKD (KUA) – Sultan Haji Ahmad Shah Airport (formally Padang Geroda Airport) / (RMAF Kuantan) – Kuantan, Pahang
 WMKE (KTE) – Kerteh Airport – Kerteh, Terengganu
 WMKF – Simpang Airport / RMAF Simpang – Sungai Besi, Kuala Lumpur
 WMKI (IPH) – Sultan Azlan Shah Airport – Ipoh, Perak
 WMKJ (JHB) – Senai International Airport (Sultan Ismail Int'l) – Senai / Johor Bahru, Johor
 WMKK (KUL) – Kuala Lumpur International Airport – Sepang, Selangor
 WMKL (LGK) – Langkawi International Airport – Langkawi (Pulau Langkawi), Kedah
 WMKM (MKZ) – Batu Berendam Airport (Malacca Airport) – Malacca
 WMKN (TGG) – Sultan Mahmud Airport – Kuala Terengganu, Terengganu
 WMKP (PEN) – Penang International Airport – George Town, Penang
 WMKS – Sungai Besi Airport – Kuala Lumpur
 WMLH – Lumut Airport – Lumut, Perak
 WMLU – Lutong Airport – Lutong
 WMPA – Pangkor Airport – Pulau Pangkor
 WMPR – Redang Airport – Pulau Redang
 WMSA (SZB) – Sultan Abdul Aziz Shah Airport – Subang Jaya, Selangor

WP - East Timor (Timor-Leste) 

 WPAT (AUT) – Atauro Airport – Atauro
 WPDB (UAI) – Suai Airport – Suai
 WPDL (DIL) – Presidente Nicolau Lobato International Airport (Comoro Int'l) – Dili
 WPEC (BCH) – Cakung Airport – Baucau
 WPFL – Fuiloro Airport – Fuiloro
 WPMN (MPT) – Maliana Airport – Maliana
 WPOC (OEC) – Oecussi Airport – Oecussi
 WPVQ – Viqueque Airport – Viqueque

WS - Singapore 

 WSAG – Sembawang Air Base (RSAF) – Singapore
 WSAP (QPG) – Paya Lebar Air Base (RSAF) – Singapore
 WSAT (TGA) – Tengah Air Base (RSAF) – Tengah
 WSSL (XSP) – Seletar Airport – Seletar
 WSSS (SIN) – Singapore Changi Airport/Changi Air Base (Joint civilian-military usage) – Changi

References

 
  - includes IATA codes
 Aviation Safety Network - IATA and ICAO airport codes
 Realignment of Location Indicators Related to The New AFTN Addressing from AIP Supplement, effective date : 05 MAR 2015

W
Airports by ICAO code
Airports by ICAO code
Airports by ICAO code
Airports by ICAO code
Airports by ICAO code